Stoney may refer to:

Places
 Stoney, Kansas, an unincorporated community in the United States
 Stoney Creek (disambiguation)
 Stoney Pond, a man-made lake located by Bucks Corners, New York
 Stoney (lunar crater)
 Stoney (Martian crater)

Arts and entertainment
 Stoney (album), by Post Malone
 the title character of Stoney Burke, an American TV series
 the Stoney family, fictional characters in Blackstone, a Canadian TV series

People
 Stoney (name), a list of people with the given name, nickname, stage name or surname
 Stoney (musician),  British musician Mark Stoney (born 1980)
 Stoney, or Shaun Murphy (singer), American singer-songwriter
 Nakoda (Stoney), an indigenous people in both Canada and the United States

Other uses
 Stoney (drink), a soft drink sold in Africa
 Stoney language, a Siouan language spoken in Canada
 Assiniboine language, also known as Stoney, a Nakotan Siouan language of the Northern Plains of Canada and the United States

See also
 
 Stoney units, a system of natural units
 Old Frankfort Stone High School, nicknamed Old Stoney, a historic American high school building
 Stony (disambiguation)
 Stone (disambiguation)